The Southern Rhodesia Legislative Council election of April 24, 1908 was the fourth election to the Legislative Council of Southern Rhodesia. The Legislative Council had, since 1903, comprised seven members elected by registered voters from four electoral districts; in 1907 the number of members nominated by the British South Africa Company was reduced from seven to five. The Administrator of Southern Rhodesia sat on the Legislative Council ex officio. The Resident Commissioner of Southern Rhodesia, James George Fair, also sat on the Legislative Council ex officio but without the right to vote.

Results

* Incumbents

Note: William Harvey Brown was absent for the third and fourth (extraordinary) sessions of the Legislative Council in 1910 and 1911.

Nominated members
The members nominated by the British South Africa Company were:

 Clarkson Henry Tredgold, Attorney-General
 Edward Ross Townsend, Secretary for Agriculture
 James Hutchison Kennedy, Master of the High Court
 Ernest William Sanders Montagu, Secretary for Mines and Works
 Francis James Newton CMG, Treasurer

During the absence of Clarkson Henry Tredgold from July 3, 1908, Robert McIlwaine (Secretary of the Law Department) stood in for him. Edward Ross Townsend stood down and was replaced by Dr Eric Arthur Nobbs (Director of Agriculture) on April 23, 1909.

References
 Source Book of Parliamentary Elections and Referenda in Southern Rhodesia 1898-1962 ed. by F.M.G. Willson (Department of Government, University College of Rhodesia and Nyasaland, Salisbury 1963)
 Holders of Administrative and Ministerial Office 1894-1964 by F.M.G. Willson and G.C. Passmore, assisted by Margaret T. Mitchell (Source Book No. 3, Department of Government, University College of Rhodesia and Nyasaland, Salisbury 1966)
 Official Year Book of the Colony of Southern Rhodesia, No. 1 - 1924, Salisbury, Southern Rhodesia

1908 elections in Africa
Legislative Council election
Legislative Council election,1908
Non-partisan elections
1908 elections in the British Empire